Sven Leuenberger (born 25 August 1969 in Niederuzwil, Switzerland) is a Swiss former professional ice hockey defenceman.

He is currently the general manager for the ZSC Lions.

Career
Playing in the NLA, Leuenberger accumulated 74 goals, 173 assists, and 443 penalty minutes in the regular season.

Leuenberger served as General Manager for SC Bern from 2006 to December 2015. He went on to coach Bern U20 team for the remainder of the 2015–16 season.

On 1 August 2008 SC Bern's coach suffered, John van Boxmeer, a heart attack side-lining him for a month. During van Boxmeer's absence, General Manager Sven Leuenberger coached the team along with assistant coach Konstantin Kurashev.

Career statistics

Achievements
1989 - NLA  Champion with SC Bern
1991 - NLA Champion with SC Bern
1992 - NLA Champion with SC Bern
1997 - NLA Champion with SC Bern

Awards
 His jersey number 16 has been retired by the SC Bern.

International play
Sven Leuenberger played a total of 124 games for the Swiss national team.

He participated in the following tournaments:

 3 A World Championships: 1991, 1992, 1993,
 3 B World Championships: 1994, 1996, 1997
 1 Olympic Games: 1992 in Albertville

References

External links

Leuenberger on hockeyfans.ch

1969 births
Living people
HC Lugano players
Ice hockey players at the 1992 Winter Olympics
Olympic ice hockey players of Switzerland
SC Bern players
Swiss ice hockey defencemen